The Michigan Library Association is a United States professional association headquartered in Lansing, Michigan that advocates for libraries in Michigan on behalf of the state's residents.  Founded in 1891 its members are more than 2,700 individuals and organizations from public, school, academic, cooperative, private and special libraries.

With a mission to lead the advancement of all Michigan libraries through advocacy, education and engagement, the Michigan Library Association (MLA) is Michigan's oldest and largest library association and has advocated for libraries on behalf of the state's residents for more than 130 years.

MLA has influenced the course of Michigan's libraries since its inception in 1891, when Mary A. Eddy, the librarian at Coldwater Free Public Library, wrote to Henry M. Utley of the Detroit Public Library about organizing a state library association. They had discussed this matter at the 1890 meeting of the American Library Association in New Hampshire, believing a state association would be helpful to Michigan librarians unable to attend national conferences. Working closely with Lucy Ball, Grand Rapids Public Library, they awakened statewide interest and arranged the first Michigan meeting in Detroit, September 1, 1891. Thirty-seven members attended, elected a slate of five officers and printed their original 40-line constitution on a 3-inch by 6-inch card. Mr. Utley became the association's first president.

Activities

Conferences and events
MLA sponsors an annual statewide conference each fall, rotating between locations in Michigan. This professional development and networking event draws hundreds of Michigan library staff yearly. A Spring Institute for Youth Services is held each spring.

Programs

MLA sponsors library awards, literary awards, mentor programs and scholarship programs, and the annual Michigan Library Appreciation Month. The Michigan Library Awards are awarded annually to members of the library community in Michigan, and are awarded jointly with Michigan Association for Media in Education (MAME), the Michigan Academic Library Association (MiALA), the Library of Michigan and the Library of Michigan Foundation.

Publication 
From 2002 to 2009, the association published the MLA Forum , an open access electronic peer-reviewed academic journal covering library and information science published by the Michigan Library Association. It was indexed by Library Literature and Library and Information Science Abstracts. The journal was initially published on a quarterly schedule. In 2008, it switched to an annual publication format. The successive editors-in-chief were Lothar Spang (Wayne State University, 2002–2005), Susann deVries (Eastern Michigan University, 2005–2007), and Michael Lorenzen (Central Michigan University, 2007–2009).

Current and past presidents
The following persons have been president of the association:

References

External links
 
 MLA Forum, online archive

Libraries in Michigan
Lansing, Michigan
Library-related professional associations